Chris Terrill is a British anthropologist, adventurer, broadcaster, author and filmmaker.

Biography
Born in Brighton, Sussex, in 1952, Terrill attended Brighton College 1965–1970, and then went to Durham University, where he gained a joint-honours degree in Geography and Anthropology. Between 1976 and 1977 he lived with the remote Acholi Tribe of Southern Sudan where he carried out doctoral research on the impact of civil war on the tribal society before taking up the post of head of geography at Rendcomb College in Gloucestershire. In 1983, he left teaching to become a full-time professional anthropologist working for the International Disaster Institute and the UN in Geneva and throughout the famine-gripped and war-ravaged areas of Africa. Later he moved into broadcasting, after being offered a job immediately following a feature interview to the BBC African Service. He changed careers and became a producer for the BBC World Service specialising in African affairs. After five years in radio, in which he engaged in current affairs, documentaries and drama, Terrill joined BBC television as a documentary producer, making investigative documentaries and observational films and series about communities all over the world.

As a programme maker, Terrill has always favoured anthropological methodology, particularly participant observation, rather than more conventional documentary making techniques.  As a Fellow of the Royal Anthropological Institute and the Royal Geographical Society, Terrill is regarded as a practising anthropologist/geographer who uses film as his primary research tool and recording medium in the field.

He won an Emmy for outstanding investigative journalism for a film called Ape Trade. This Inside Story Special (BBC1) exposed the major gangs smuggling endangered orangutans to illegal markets in Taiwan, the US and Russia. Other notable films/series he made for the BBC were Subway, Yellow Line, Race Game, Miami Wild, HMS Brilliant, Alison's Last Mountain, Beloved Country, Soho Stories (see below), The Cruise, Jailbirds, Tito's Story, Through the Eyes of the Old and The Ship.  After 20 years at the BBC, and with over 100 prime time films and numerous awards to his name, he left the corporation in 2003 after being headhunted by Elisabeth Murdoch for her newly set up Shine company.  For Shine Terrill made several prime time music and arts films and a major series about the Royal Navy (Shipmates BBC1).  Two years later Terrill set up his own company, Uppercut Films, and began to specialise in military and high adventure documentaries—though always concentrating on communities/groups and their internal dynamics. In 2007, he documented and participated in the rigorous eight months training with the Royal Marine Commandos after which he followed the newly qualified recruits to the front line in Afghanistan for their first taste of real war. Terrill is the only civilian (and, at 55, the oldest person) to complete and pass all four commando tests for which he was awarded the iconic green beret.

Terrill produces his own camerawork and sound recording without a film crew. This "lone wolf" technique is a hallmark of his work. Using the new digital technology, he was the first mainstream filmmaker to experiment as a self-shooting/self-recording director in the mid 1990s when he made Soho Stories for the BBC; a seminal series that won him the Royal Television Society Award for Innovation. This series which explored London's famous and flamboyant Soho district, was one of the first to be dubbed docu-soap in its style of filmmaking. Terrill then went on to refine his techniques on prime time series such as The Cruise (BBC1), Jailbirds (BBC1), Through the Eyes of the Old (BBC1), The Ship (BBC2), Shipmates (BBC 1) and two feature documentary specials on Charlotte Church—Spreading Her Wings (BBC1) and Confessions of a Teen-angel (ITV1). Commando: On the Front Line (ITV1)—an account of Royal Marine Commandos fighting in Afghanistan was followed by Nature's Fury (ITV1) a trilogy on the world's greatest storms and their impact on communities.

In 2009 Terrill made a series on the Theatre Royal, Haymarket, London, called Theatreland for Sky Arts. This was an intimate portrait of theatre people at work and featured Ian McKellen, Patrick Stewart, Simon Callow, Ronald Pickup and Anna Friel. In the same year he made a two-part film series about Royal Marines, badly injured in Afghanistan, attempting to climb in the high Himalayas (Wartorn Warriors—Sky1). In 2011 Terrill returned to working with the Royal Marines when he joined 42 Commando in the dangerous Nad e Ali (north) district of Helmand Province. This was for a 6-part series commissioned by Channel Five entitled "Royal Marines: Mission Afghanistan" transmitted in January/February 2012.

In late 2011 Terrill embarked on a project that brought together the military and the theatre. The Theatre Royal, Haymarket (where Terrill had filmed Theatreland in 2009) put on a play using injured soldiers and marines as the actors, singers, and dancers. The play, written by the poet Owen Sheers and based on the experiences of the soldiers mostly in Afghanistan, was called The Two Worlds of Charlie F and was performed on 22 January 2012. Terrill's feature-length film entitled Theatre of War, documenting the preparation of the play, was shown on BBC1's Imagine strand and was nominated for a prestigious Grierson Award in the best arts documentary category.

In 2014 Terrill's current affairs film for the BBC: Marine A: Criminal or Casualty of War? won the Evcom Clarion Award for ethics in journalism.

In 2015 Terrill became a Fellow of the Maritime Foundation and was presented with a Lifetime Achievement Award.

He returned to HMS Queen Elizabeth in 2018 and spent four months at sea to make a second series, "Britain's Biggest Warship: Goes to Sea". This focuses on the marrying of the ship with the F35 Lightning Stealth Fighter off the eastern seaboard of the US.

In January 2018 Terrill was conferred Doctor of Science at the Winter Congregation of Durham University "for pioneering work in anthropology and filmmaking"

In 2019 Terrill finished filming on a project that had take him 25 years to complete.  Called The Last Mountain this feature documentary for cinematic release told the extraordinary story of Tom and Kate Ballard the son and daughter of Alison Hargreaves, arguably the greatest female mountaineer the world has ever seen.  Shot in spectacular high altitude mountain locations in the Himalayas and the Karakoram, The Last Mountain was released in 2020 and so far the film has garnered six international awards and a further three nominations including two for the Griersons - the British Documentary Awards    

For seven months in 2021 Terrill was back on HMS Queen Elizabeth for her first operational deployment to the South China Sea.  This was to film for a six part series for the BBC called “The Warship: Tour of Duty” shown on prime time BBC2 for the first time in January and February 2023. 

Terrill lectures widely on film making techniques – especially on working solo in the field. He holds regular workshops for young filmmakers.

Personal life

In 1999 Terrill was engaged for a brief period to former glamour model Heather Mills.  He proposed to her on a fishing boat whilst sailing up the Mekong River in Cambodia, where they were making a film about landmines.

In 2009 Terrill married the BAFTA award-winning filmmaker Christine Hall.

On 9 February 2013 Terrill received a full apology in open court from News UK for repeatedly hacking his phone in 2005/06.  They also paid undisclosed but substantial damages plus costs.

Terrill, who describes himself as a 'devout Atheist', is a dedicated animal advocate and activist.  He is also an accomplished amateur athlete, specialising in ultra running and boxing.

Books published

Filmography

Honours, awards and nominations

Honours

Awards

Nominations

Public Service Interests

Notes

References

External links
Commando: On The Front Line
Jon Stratford—PTI during filming of Commando: On The Front Line
http://www.uppercutfilms.co.uk

English film producers
English film directors
English cinematographers
English television producers
English television directors
English writers
British investigative journalists
People educated at Brighton College
Alumni of Collingwood College, Durham
British war correspondents
1952 births
Living people